The 2022 Munster Senior Hurling Championship was the 2022 installment of the annual Munster Senior Hurling Championship organised by Munster GAA. Limerick entered the competition as defending champions and won their 4th Munster Championship title in succession.

Group stage

Munster table

{| class="wikitable" style="text-align:center"
!width=20|
!width=150 style="text-align:left;"|Team
!width=20|
!width=20|
!width=20|
!width=20|
!width=40|
!width=40|
!width=20|
!width=20|
!style="text-align:left;" | Qualification
|- style="background:#ccffcc"
|1||align=left| Clare ||4||3||1||0||6-104||7-79||+22||7
| style="text-align:left;" rowspan="2" |Advance to Munster Final
|- style="background:#ccffcc"
|2||align=left| Limerick ||4||3||1||0||6-97||3-85||+21||7
|- style="background:#FFFFE0"
|3||align=left| Cork ||4||2||0||2||8-89||4-96||+5||4
| style="text-align:left;" | Advance to Preliminary Quarter-Finals
|-
|4||align=left| Waterford||4||1||0||3||7-76||7-103||-27||2
| rowspan="2" |
|-
|5||align=left| Tipperary||4||0||0||4||5-83||11-96||-65||0
|}

Munster round 1

Munster round 2

Munster round 3

Munster round 4

Munster round 5

Munster Final 

Limerick advance to the All-Ireland Semi-finals and Clare advance to the All-Ireland Quarter-finals.

See also 
2022 All-Ireland Senior Hurling Championship
2022 Leinster Senior Hurling Championship

References 

2022 All-Ireland Senior Hurling Championship
Munster Senior Hurling Championship